The family tree of Genghis Khan is listed below. This family tree only lists prominent members of the Borjigin family and does not reach the present. Genghis Khan appears in the middle of the tree, and Kublai Khan appears at the bottom of the tree. The Borjigin family was the imperial house of the Mongol Empire (and its various successor states, dating back to the 13th and 14th centuries.

Diagrammatic family tree
Only selected, prominent members are shown. Khagans (Great Khans who were rulers of the whole empire) are in bold.

Detailed family tree
This section is divided in a series of sub-sections for better understanding. The first part traces Genghis Khan's lineage back to the dawn of the Mongol people, while the second part accounts for his notable descendants (ones that assumed leading roles within the Mongol Empire or later states). The first part is based on the written accounts of The Secret History of the Mongols, a semi-mythical and semi-accurate work of history.

The second part is based on the work of several different scholars and historians (especially Rashid al-Din Hamadani), which are, in most cases, incomplete and even conflicting. The index preceding the individual's name represents the number of generations since a common ancestor (in the first part: Borte Chino; in the second part: Genghis Khan).

Genghis Khan's ancestors 
Borte Chino (Grey Wolf) and his wife was Gua Maral (White Doe)
1. Bat Tsagan - was the son of Borte Chino and Gua Maral
2. Tamacha - was the son of Bat Tsagan
3. Horichar Mergen - was the son of Tamacha
4. Uujim Buural - was the son of Horichar Mergen
5. Sali Hachau - was the son of Uujim Buural
6. Yehe Nidun - was the son of Sali Hachau
7. Sem Sochi - was the son of Yehe Nidun
8. Harchu - was the son of Sem Sochi
9.Borjigidai Mergen - was the son of Harchu, and his wife was Mongoljin Gua
10. Torogoljin Bayan - was the son of Borjigidai Mergen, and his wife was Borogchin Gua
11. Duva Sokhor - was the first son of Torogoljin Bayan
11. Dobun Mergen - was the second son of Torogoljin Bayan, and his wife was Alan Gua
12. Belgunudei - was the first son of Dobun Mergen and Alan Gua
12. Bugunudei - was the second son of Dobun Mergen and Alan Gua
12. Bukhu Khatagi - was the first son of Alan Gua, conceived after the death of Dobun Mergen
12. Bukhatu Salji - was the second son of Alan Gua, conceived after the death of Dobun Mergen
12. Bodonchar Munkhag - was the third son of Alan Gua, conceived after the death of Dobun Mergen
13. Habich Baghatur - was the son of Bodonchar Munkhag
14. Menen Tudun - was the son of Habich Baghatur
15. Hachi Hulug - was the son of Menen Tudun
16. Khaidu - was the son of Hachi Hulug
17. Bashinkhor Dogshin - was the first son of Khaidu
18. Tumbinai Setsen - was the son of Baishinkhor Dogshin
19. Khabul Khan - was the first son of Tumbinai Setsen, and Khan of the Khamag Mongol ( 1130 – 1148)
19. Khaduli Barlas - was the second son of Tumbinai Setsen, as well as military leader and administrator of Khamag Mongol and the ancestor of Qarachar Barlas who was the founder of Barlas.
20. Ohinbarhag - was the first son of Khabul Khan
20. Bartan Baghatur - was the second son of Khabul Khan
21. Mengitu Hiyan - was the first son of Bartan Baghatur
21. Negun Taiji - was the second son of Bartan Baghatur
21. Yesugei - was the third son of Bartan Baghatur, and his wife was Hoelun
22. Temujin (Genghis Khan) - was the first son of Yesugei and Hoelun, and Khan of the Khamag Mongol (1189–1206)
22. Hasar - was the second son of Yesugei and Hoelun
22. Hachiun - was the third son of Yesugei and Hoelun
22. Temuge - was the fourth son of Yesugei and Hoelun
22. Behter - was the first son of Yesugei and his lesser wife Sochigel
22. Belgutei - was the second son of Yesugei and his lesser wife Sochigel
21. Daridai - was the fourth son of Bartan Baghatur
20. Hutugtu Monhor - was the third son of Khabul Khan
20. Hotula Khan - was the fourth son of Khabul Khan, and Khan of the Khamag Mongol (1156–1160)
20. Hulan - was the fifth son of Khabul Khan
20. Hadan - was the sixth son of Khabul Khan
20. Todoi - was the seventh son of Khabul Khan
19.  Semsochule - was the second son of Tumbinai Setsen
20. Ardi Barlas - was the first son of Semsochule
17. Chirhya Lynhua - was the second son of Khaidu
18. Sengun Bilge - was the son of Chirhya Lynhua
19. Ambaghai Khan - was the son of Sengun Bilge, and Khan of the Khamag Mongol (1149–1156)

Genghis Khan's descendants 
Temujin (Genghis Khan) - Founder and Khagan of the Mongol Empire (1206–1227)
 01. Jochi - Ruler of the Ulus of Jochi (later known as Golden Horde or Kipchak Khanate)
 02. Orda - Founder and Khan of the White Horde (1226–1251)
 03. Sartaqtai
 04. Qonichi - Khan of the White Horde (1280–1302)
05. Bayan - Khan of the White Horde (1302–1309)
06. Sasi-Buqa - Khan of the White Horde (1309–1320)
 07. Erzen - Khan of the White Horde (1320–1345)
 08. Chimtai - Khan of the White Horde (1345–1361)
 03. Qonqiran - Khan of the White Horde (1251–1280)
02. Batu - Founder and Khan of the Blue Horde (1227–1255) and ruling Khan of the Golden Horde  (1227–1255)
03. Sartaq - Khan of the Blue Horde (1255–1256) and ruling Khan of the Golden Horde (1255–1256)
04. Ulaghchi - Khan of the Blue Horde (1256–1257) and ruling Khan of the Golden Horde (1256–1257)
03. Toqoqan
04. Tartu
05. Tole-Buqa - Khan of the Blue Horde (1287–1291) and ruling Khan of the Golden Horde (1287–1291)
04. Mongke-Temur - Khan of the Blue Horde (1267–1280) and ruling Khan of the Golden Horde (1267–1280)
05. Toqta - Khan of the Blue Horde (1291–1313) and ruling Khan of the Golden Horde (1291–1313)
05. Toghrilcha
06. Oz-Beg - Khan of the Blue Horde (1313–1341) and ruling Khan of the Golden Horde (1313–1341)
07. Tini-Beg - Khan of the Blue Horde (1341–1342) and ruling Khan of the Golden Horde (1341–1342)
07. Jani-Beg - Khan of the Blue Horde (1342–1357) and ruling Khan of the Golden Horde (1342–1357)
08. Berdi-Beg - Khan of the Blue Horde (1357–1359) and ruling Khan of the Golden Horde (1357–1359)
08. Qulpa - Khan of the Blue Horde (1359–1360) and ruling Khan of the Golden Horde (1359–1360)
08. Nawruz-Beg - Khan of the Blue Horde (1360–1361) and ruling Khan of the Golden Horde (1360–1361)
04. Tode-Mongke - Khan of the Blue Horde (1280–1287) and ruling Khan of the Golden Horde (1280–1287)
02. Berke - Khan of the Blue Horde (1257–1267) and ruling Khan of the Golden Horde (1257–1267)
02. Shiban
03. Qadaq
04. Tole-Buqa
05. Mingqutai
 06. Khidr - Khan of the Blue Horde (1361–1361) and ruling Khan of the Golden Horde (1361–1361)
02. Teval
03. Tatar
04. Nogai
05. Chaka - Emperor of Bulgaria (1299–1300)
02. Tuqa-Timur
03. Bai-Temur
04. Toqanchar
05. Sasi
06. Tuglu-Temur - Khan of the White Horde (1362–1364)
06. Qara-Nogai - Khan of the White Horde (1360–1362)
06. Buker-Khwaja - Khan of the White Horde (1364–1366)
05. Boz-Qulaq
06. Mubarak-Khwaja - Khan of the White Horde (1366–1368)
03. Knots-Temur
04. Khwaja
05. Badik
06. Urus - Khan of the White Horde (1368–1376) and Khan of the Blue Horde (1372–1374)
07. Toqtaqiya - Khan of the White Horde (1376–1377)
07. Temur-Malik - Khan of the White Horde (1377–1378)
08. Temür Qutlugh - Khan of the Golden Horde (1395–1399)
09. Temur - Khan of the Golden Horde (1410–1411)
10. Küchük Muhammad - Khan of the Golden Horde (1435–1459)
11. Mahmud Astrakhani - Khan of the Golden Horde (1459–1465) and Khan of Astrakhan (1465–1466)
11. Ahmad - Khan of the Great Horde (1465–1481)
12. Murtaza - Khan of the Great Horde (1493–1494)
13. Aq Kubek
14. Abdullah
15. Mustafa Ali - Khan of Qasim (1584–1590)
12. Syed Ahmad
13. Qasim II Astrakhani
14. Yadigar Muhammad - Khan of Kazan (1552–1552)
12. Sheikh Ahmed - Khan of the Great Horde (1481–1493, 1494–1502)
12. Bahadur
13. Beg-Bulat
14. Sain-Bulat - Khan of Qasim (1567–1573)
11. Bakhtiyar
12. Sheikh Allahyar - Khan of Qasim (1512–1516)
13. Shah Ali - Khan of Qasim (1516–1519, 1535–1551, 1552–1567) and Khan of Kazan (1519–1521, 1551–1552)
13. Jan Ali - Khan of Qasim (1519–1532) and Khan of Kazan (1532–1535)
08. Shadi Beg - Khan of the Golden Horde (1399–1407)
08. Pulad - Khan of the Golden Horde (1407–1410)
07. Koirichak
08. Baraq - Khan of the Golden Horde (1422–1427)
09. Janibek Khan - Khan of Kazakh Khanate (1463-1473)
06. Tuli-Khwaja
07. Toqtamish - Khan of the White Horde (1378–1380) and Khan of the Golden Horde (1380–1395)
08. Jalal al-Din - Khan of the Golden Horde (1411–1412)
09. Ulugh Muhammad - Khan of the Golden Horde (1419–1420, 1427–1435) and Khan of Kazan (1437–1445)
10. Mahmud - Khan of Kazan (1445–1462)
11. Khalil - Khan of Kazan (1462–1467)
11. Ibrahim - Khan of Kazan (1467–1479)
12. Ali - Khan of Kazan (1479–1484, 1485–1487)
12. Muhammad Amin - Khan of Kazan (1484–1485, 1487–1495, 1502–1519)
12. Abdul Latif - Khan of Kazan (1496–1502)
10. Qasim - Khan of Qasim (1452–1468)
11. Daniyal - Khan of Qasim (1468–1486)
08. Karim-Berdi - Khan of the Golden Horde (1412–1414)
08. Kebek - Khan of the Golden Horde (1414–1417)
08. Jabbar-Berdi - Khan of the Golden Horde (1417–1419)
09. Dawlat Berdi - Khan of the Golden Horde (1420–1422)
Chagatai, founder of the Chagatai Khanate in present-day Iran, reputed ancestor of Babur of the Mughal Empire in India.
See :Category:Chagatai khans
Son Mö'etüken
Son Qara Hülëgü (d. 1252), Khan of the Chagatai Khanate 1242–1246 and 1252.
Son Mubarak Shah, Khan of the Chagatai Khanate 1252–1260 and 1266.
Son Yesünto'a
Son Baraq (d. 1271), Khan of the Chagatai Khanate 1266–1271.
Duwa Temür, Khan of the Chagatai Khanate 1274–1306
Kebek, Khan of the Chagatai Khanate 1309 and 1318–1326
Tarmashirin (died 1334), Khan of Chagatai Khanate 1327–1334
Baidar
Son Yesü Möngke, (d. 1252), Khan of the Chagatai Khanate 1252.
Son Alghu, (d. ca. 1266), Khan of the Chagatai Khanate 1260–1266.

Ögedei, ruled as Khagan 1229–1241.
Son Güyük, Khagan 1246–1248.
Son Kadan.
Son Kashin.
Son Kaidu (d. 1301)
Tolui - Sorghaghtani Beki
Son Möngke, Khagan 1251–1259.
Son Kublai, Khagan 1260–1294, founder of Yuan Dynasty in China (as Emperor Shizu).
Son Zhenjin.
Son Timür, Khan 1294–1307, ruled as Emperor Chengzong.
Son Darmabala 
Son Qayshan, Khan 1308–1311, ruled as Emperor Wuzong.
See list of Emperors of the Yuan Dynasty and Yuan Dynasty family tree.
Son Hulagu founder of the Ilkhanate in Iran and Mesopotamia.
See :Category: Il-Khan emperors
Son Abaqa, Il-Khan 1265–1282.
Son Arghun, Il-Khan 1284–1291 - Buluqhan Khatan (wife).
Ghazan Khan (1271–1304), Khan of the Ilkhanate 1295–1304
Öljaitü Khan (1280–1316), Khan of the Ilkhanate 1304–1316
Abu Sa'id (1305–1335), Khan of the Ilkhanate 1316–1335
Son Gaykhatu, Il-Khan 1291–1295 - Padshah Hatun (wife).
Son Tekuder (later "Ahmed Tekuder"), Il-Khan 1282–1284.
Son Taraghai
Son Baydu, Khan of the Ilkhanate 1295
Son Ariq Böke fought Kublai for Khan.
Alakhai Bekhi, ruler of the Ongud under Genghis Khan
 Checheikhen, ruler of the Oirats under Genghis Khan
 Orghana, Regent of the Chagatai Khanate (1252–1261)
 Mubarak Shah, Khan of the Chagatai Khanate (1252–1260)
 Alaltun, ruler of the Uyghur oases under Genghis Khan

Ancestral Family Tree
This is a family tree made using the mentions from The Secret History of the Mongols. Most names are written twice in different spellings.

Citations

See also
 Borjigin
 Descent from Genghis Khan
 Yuan and Northern Yuan dynasties emperor's family tree

Sources

 
 Primary sources

 
 Abulgazi, Shejere-i Tarakime (Genealogical Tree of the Turks, 1659 // Simurg, 1996, ; Abulgazi, "Shejerei Terakime", Ashgabat, 1992; Abulgaziy, "Shajarai Türk", Tashkent, 1992)
 B. Sumiyabaatar, "The Genealogy of the Mongols", 720 P, 2003, ]; The genealogy of the families mentioned in this book generally goes back to 18 generations. The genealogy of Chingis Khan which began 1.500 years or 40-50 generations ago and comprises hundreds of thousands of people prevented Mongolian blood from being mixed with that of other nations. Due to the encouragement of intra-tribal marriages family lines were kept stringent. From 1920 onward people were not allowed to keep genealogical records, and the descendants of the nobles and scholars were tortured and killed. This prohibition lasted for about 70 years or three generations. Although the keeping of genealogical records was rare during that period, Mongolians used to pass information about their ancestors to their children orally.

Notes

References 

Family trees
Family Tree